Microxyla is a genus of moths of the family Erebidae. The genus was erected by Shigero Sugi in 1982.

Species
Microxyla stipata (Walker, 1863) Sri Lanka, southern India, Borneo
Microxyla confusa (Wileman, 1911) Japan

References

Calpinae